Euphydryas anicia, the anicia checkerspot, is a species in the family of butterflies known as Nymphalidae. It was first described by Edward Doubleday in 1847 and it is found in North America.

The MONA or Hodges number for Euphydryas anicia is 4519.

Subspecies
These 24 subspecies belong to Euphydryas anicia:

 Euphydryas anicia alena Barnes & Benjamin, 1926 i
 Euphydryas anicia anicia (E. Doubleday, 1847) i b (anicia checkerspot)
 Euphydryas anicia bakeri D. Stallings & Turner, 1945 i
 Euphydryas anicia bernadetta Leussler, 1920 i
 Euphydryas anicia brucei (W. H. Edwards, 1888) i b
 Euphydryas anicia capella (Barnes, 1897) i b (capella checkerspot)
 Euphydryas anicia carmentis Barnes & Benjamin, 1926 i b
 Euphydryas anicia chuskae (Ferris & R. Holland, 1980) i
 Euphydryas anicia cloudcrofti (Ferris & R. Holland, 1980) i b (Sacramento Mountain checkerspot)
 Euphydryas anicia effi D. Stallings & Turner, 1945 i
 Euphydryas anicia eurytion (Mead, 1875) i b (anicia checkerspot)
 Euphydryas anicia helvia (Scudder, 1869) i
 Euphydryas anicia hermosa (W. G. Wright, 1905) i b (Catalina mountain checkerspot)
 Euphydryas anicia hopfingeri Gunder, 1934 i b (Hopfinger's checkerspot)
 Euphydryas anicia howlandi D. Stallings & Turner, 1947 i
 Euphydryas anicia macyi Fender & Jewett, 1953 i
 Euphydryas anicia magdalena Barnes & McDunnough, 1918 i b (White Mountain checkerspot)
 Euphydryas anicia maria (Skinner, 1899) i
 Euphydryas anicia morandi Gunder, 1928 i
 Euphydryas anicia variicolor Baughman & Murphy, 1998 i
 Euphydryas anicia veazieae Fender & Jewett, 1953 i
 Euphydryas anicia wecoeut M. Fisher, Spomer & Scott, 2006 i b (anicia checkerspot)
 Euphydryas anicia wheeleri (Hy. Edwards, 1881) i b
 Euphydryas anicia windi Gunder, 1932 i b (Wind's checkerspot)

Data sources: i = ITIS, c = Catalogue of Life, g = GBIF, b = Bugguide.net

References

Further reading

External links

 

Euphydryas
Articles created by Qbugbot